Nerina Shute (17 July 1908 – 20 October 2004) was an English writer and journalist, described by the Sunday Times as "the amazingly colourful, brilliant and bisexual film critic".

Early life
Shute was born in Prudhoe, Northumberland. Her father, Cameron Shute, was the ne'er-do-well son of a general, Sir Charles Shute, who had fought at Balaclava and was MP for Brighton from 1874 to 1880.

Her racy mother, née Amy Bertha ("Renie") Pepper Stavely, was of a well-to-do family with its seat at Woldhurstlea, near Crawley, West Sussex and was the author of a rip-roaring Edwardian novel The Unconscious Bigamist. She was sedulous in not sleeping with her lovers: she married six of them. The second of these husbands was Nerina’s father. After a childhood overshadowed by her parents’ fast living in London and then Hollywood, in the course of which she sold her first story to McClure’s Magazine at 16, for $150, she returned to England. There, living in Devon, she soon became as discontented as she had been in America.

She arrived in London in 1928. While staying at the hostel which later inspired Muriel Spark, she took a post at the Times Book Club. Soon she graduated to Film Weekly, where she was told: “You have a very impertinent pen” after calling Madeleine Carroll a "ruthless Madonna". Fearing the worst, she was startled to get a rise and requests for more of the same; she provided it, with sparkling dismissals of the "It" set of the day. For all her bravura, though, she was vexed by "it", by the "sheer awkwardness," she wrote, "of being a modern girl and, at the same time, a virgin".

She contemplated marriage to a man called Charles, a doctor who had been struck off for performing an abortion, but thought better of it and promptly missed him while the capital buzzed. Of London's lesbians she noted: “They lied, cheated and had hysterics . . . the code of homosexuality might be all right in theory but the people who practised it were intolerable.”

All this would form a part of the novel, Another Man’s Poison, which she had written in the evenings and at weekends. Palpably autobiographical, it tells of young Melis Gordon whose wild mother leaves a naval husband for Hollywood lovers. With descriptions of American schoolgirl life, its heroine even writes a prizewinning story before being recalled to an England of dull Devon and wild, flirtatious London. It appeared in 1931.

If unduly long, and without the vim of her journalism, Shute’s book showed that the world depicted with more economy in Evelyn Waugh's Vile Bodies was no fantasy. Rebecca West declared: “Miss Shute writes, not so much badly as barbarously, as if she had never read anything but a magazine, never seen a picture but a moving one, never heard any music except at restaurants. Yet she is full of talent.”

This was priceless publicity, or something close to it, for the Sunday Graphic hired her at ten guineas a week over the heading “the girl with the barbarous touch” — some compensation for her novel’s getting her cut from the will of a family friend.

Among Shute’s many friends were Alfred Hitchcock, Anna Neagle and Herbert Wilcox. Later on, Lord Beaverbrook, the proprietor of the Daily Express, summoned her to meet him at his home. After a brief interview, he gave her a five-pound note, a job at the Express and invited her to ride horses with him the next week. But that was the only time they met, and she shortly lost the job at the Express.

She moved to Liverpool for six months to live with Charles, but six months was all that she could take. She dropped him and returned to London.

Film critic
She got a job with the Sunday Referee, which made her film critic. Suddenly, she was in a world of morning shows, lunches of cocktails and caviar at the Savoy. A boon companion for more than two years was John Betjeman, who was at that time the film critic for the Standard.

The Referee job ended in 1935, but that summer became a reporter with the Dispatch. Within days, just as Betjeman would later that month be fired from the Standard for not toiling to Southampton for an actress's arrival, Shute had refused to go and give a female view of a Home Counties train crash at which, it turned out, 11 people had died. All was not lost: H.G. Wells agreed to an interview, and her account – "his walk resembles that of a young woman hurrying into a hat shop" – merited the front page. This led to work for Radio Normandy, sponsored by a soap-flake company, which prompted Max Factor to take her on as a publicist. She was, she said, "changed by make-up, peroxide and expensive tailored suits into a modern person who caught the eye" – though one who declared, privately, "what Goebbels does for Germany, I do for Max Factor.”

Relationships
She had a mystery female lover, Josephine, and several flirtations with men during the 1930s. Then she met a journalist, James Wentworth Day. Despite his being of a clubbish, anti-Modernist hue, she married him in 1936.

After two years of bored housewifery, she left him and when it was formed in mid-1939, began training in the WAAF. She soon resigned and learnt to drive an ambulance.

Visiting her mother in Rottingdean, Sussex, she met two women: “Andy” Sharpe and, somewhat older, Helen Mayo, respectively a gynaecologist and one of the first female dental surgeons. Nerina enjoyed an affair with Helen and moved into the pair’s house in August 1939. After war broke out, she joined a North London ambulance team.

A year after the outbreak of war she met the broadcaster Howard Marshall. As famous in his day as his friend Richard Dimbleby, he had sent his family abroad, and he and Shute conducted a passionate affair. When his wife returned the lovers agreed to separate for three months, but managed only two, then married.

Their union, which had been joyful as wartime subterfuge, proved fraught in the candour of peace. She found refuge in writing, with a novel about Fanny Burney, Georgian Lady (1958), followed by Poet Pursued (about Shelley, 1951) and Victorian Love Story (on Rossetti, 1954). Shute's marriage was not helped by losing a baby and the marriage ended after she confessed to him, during a row on New Year's Eve, 1953, that she was having an affair with their French maid.

After a brief return to London, to work for Andy Sharpe, and alarmed, in her turn, by goings-on among the young Chelsea set, Shute returned after her mother died to live with her latest stepfather, Noel, in Sussex. Much the same age, they were attracted by the Beatles on television; London beckoned, and they moved to a flat in Cadogan Place, off the King's Road. Some assumed that Noel was either her husband, brother or lover, but in fact the household was completed by the celebrated ballroom dancer Phyllis Haylor (April 18, 1904 – December 13, 1981), with whom Shute had been immediately smitten, and who was a part of her life for 22 years, until her death in 1981.

In 1989, Shute was introduced by a friend to the artist Jocelyn Williams who became her lover and, as Shute's long life neared its end, her devoted carer.

Later life
Despite missing Marshall, she had achieved serenity and, as if in gratitude, helped at a hostel for unmarried mothers (girls with "syncopated moralities", she said) and later gave much time to the Samaritans. She did not become pompous or censorious but, living in Putney to which they had moved in 1979, was always happy to look back chortlingly at so long and colourful a life.

She also wrote two volumes on London's villages and a study of the Spencer family's royal connections, but her four volumes of memoirs are her most imaginative production: in revealing more each time, she had to drop as many good stories as she included. With the publication of Passionate Friendships in 1992, she was finally able to be open about her own bisexuality. "For many years I have managed to keep my secrets to myself," she wrote, "protecting the men and women I have loved. Now all my loved ones are dead and no longer vulnerable. No one is left who might be hurt or damaged by these confessions unless it is myself.”

Books
Another Man's Poison (1931) a novel
 "We Mixed Our Drinks (1945) [a memoir]
Poet Pursued (1951) about Shelley 
Victorian Love Story (1954) about Rossetti
"Favourite Books for Boys and Girls" (1955) [about children's reading habits]
Come into The Sunlight (1957) a memoir of her mother
"Malady of Love" (1962)
Georgian Lady (1958) about Fanny Burney
The Escapist Generations (1973) My London Story
"London Villages" (1977) [History of London]
"More London Villages" (1981)[History]
"The Royal Family and the Spencers" (1986) [History/Biography]
Passionate Friendships (1992) a memoir

References

External links
Times obituary
Guardian obituary
Shepperton Babylon: The Lost Worlds of British Cinema (2005) by Matthew Sweet, "Faber and Faber" 

1908 births
2004 deaths
English film critics
Bisexual women
People from Prudhoe
Writers from Northumberland
English women novelists
20th-century English novelists
20th-century English women writers
British women film critics
English LGBT writers
Bisexual memoirists
English women non-fiction writers
Women memoirists
20th-century LGBT people